Summerfield is a town in Guilford County, North Carolina. The population was 7,018 at the 2000 census. At the 2010 census, the population had risen to 10,232.

The town is largely regarded as a suburb of Greensboro and as development has grown, the town has slowly transformed from a rural farming area into a bedroom community. It features a town hall, along Oak Ridge Road (aka NC 150), west of Battleground Avenue (aka US 220), as well as a shopping center east of Battleground Avenue and Auburn Road, located on the eastern portion of NC 150. Interstate 73 passes just west of the town's center, connecting with NC 150, and also connecting with US 158 in the northernmost part of the town.

History
The area was settled in about 1769 by Charles Bruce and acquired the name Bruce's Crossroads. In February 1781 patriot forces under General Henry Lee III and British forces under General Banastre Tarleton skirmished at the crossroads during the American Revolutionary War. In 1812 a post office was established, and the community was renamed Summerfield, in homage to evangelist John Summerfield.

Summerfield School Gymnasium and Community Center has a gym that was listed on the National Register of Historic Places in 2012. The Summerfield Historic District was listed in 2005.

Former North Carolina Governor Alexander Martin had a house that he lived in the town square of Summerfield, which is not standing today. George Washington stayed in the house during the Revolutionary War. There is currently a historical home on the square known as the Martin House, but it was lived in by a son of the Governor. Currently, the Martin House is owned by the town of Summerfield.

Geography
According to the U.S. Census Bureau, the town has a total area of 27.3 square miles (70.7 km), of which 27.1 square miles (70.2 km) is land and 0.2 square miles (0.4 km) (0.62%) is water.

Demographics

2020 census
As of the 2020 U.S. census, there were 10,951 people, 3,902 households, and 3,227 families residing in the town.

2010 census
At the 2010 census, there were 10,232 people, 2,518 households and 2,094 families residing in the town. There were 2,653 housing units at an average density of 97.9 per square mile (37.8/km). The racial makeup of the town was 93.47% Caucasian, 4.03% African American, 0.44% Native American, 0.64% Asian, 0.56% from other races, and 0.85% from two or more races. Hispanic or Latino were 1.42% of the population.

There were 2,518 households, of which 41.8% had children under the age of 18 living with them, 74.4% were married couples living together, 6.0% had a female householder with no husband present, and 16.8% were non-families. 14.0% of all households were made up of individuals, and 4.8% had someone living alone who was 65 years of age or older. The average household size was 2.78 and the average family size was 3.07.

Age distribution was 28.1% under the age of 18, 5.1% from 18 to 24, 30.5% from 25 to 44, 27.9% from 45 to 64, and 8.4% who were 65 years of age or older. The median age was 39 years. For every 100 females, there were 99.1 males. For every 100 females age 18 and over, there were 97.2 males.

The median household income was $71,738, and the median family income was $79,433. Males had a median income of $51,838 versus $32,798 for females. The per capita income for the town was $33,116. About 2.5% of families and 3.8% of the population were below the poverty line, including 4.3% of those under age 18 and 6.6% of those age 65 or over.

Education
Summerfield serves as home to Summerfield Elementary School which serves as the primary school for grades kindergarten to fifth grade in the town. Summerfield Charter Academy (SCA), a charter school operated by National Heritage Academies is also located in Summerfield and educates children from kindergarten through eighth grade although it is not as open and flexible as most charter schools tend to be.  Students of SCA are known as the Summerfield Stampede. Most people in Summerfield attend Northern Guilford Middle School and Northern Guilford High School, while some attend Northern Elementary School, all three located east on Route 150, in proximity to Brown Summit, and having the Nighthawk as their mascot. Some residents attend Northwest Guilford Middle School followed by Northwest Guilford High School, both of which are located nearby in Greensboro.  The mascot of the NW schools and Summerfield Elementary School is the Viking.

Notable people
Alexander Martin, former North Carolina governor
Andrew Jackson, 7th president of the United States
Harold L. Martin, chancellor of North Carolina A&T State University

References

Works cited

External links
 Official website of Summerfield, NC
 The Stokesdale Star a local newspaper serving Summerfield, NC

Rockingham County, North Carolina
Towns in Guilford County, North Carolina
Towns in North Carolina